Bonney Downs Station is a pastoral lease that was once a sheep station but now operates as a cattle station in Western Australia. 

Neighbouring properties include Momalanna Station.

The heritage listed homestead is found on the property. The homestead has been classified by the National Trust and is on the Register of the National Estate.

In 1912 the station had a flock of 5,200 sheep and produced 93 bales of wool during shearing.

In 2015 the station sold off many of its Santa Gertrudis and Droughtmaster cattle following a season of unpredictable rainfall. The station manager, Peter Goyder, who also manages Warradarge Station, intended to sell off stock at a rate of 200 a week for six months.

In 2019 it featured on Prospero Productions's Outback Pilots series.

See also
List of ranches and stations
List of pastoral leases in Western Australia

References

Pastoral leases in Western Australia
Stations (Australian agriculture)
Homesteads in Western Australia
Pilbara